Cleveland was an electoral district of the Legislative Assembly in the Australian state of Queensland from 1992 to 2017.

Based in the northern part of Redland City Council, the district included the suburbs of Wellington Point, Ormiston, Cleveland and Thornlands. It also covers the entirety of North Stradbroke Island.

In the 2017 electoral redistribution, the Electoral Commission of Queensland changed the name of the electorate to Oodgeroo.

Members for Cleveland

Election results

References

External links
 Electorate profile (Antony Green, ABC)

Former electoral districts of Queensland
Constituencies established in 1992
Constituencies disestablished in 2017
1992 establishments in Australia
2017 disestablishments in Australia